Hell's Kitchen was an American rock group formed in 1987 when the guitarist Luke Skeels decided to leave Boneless Ones due to conflict with that band's singer. When the other members heard the news, they too left en masse, and Hell's Kitchen was born. The band recruited members of  Verbal Abuse and Fang, for the first lineup.  The band was known for its expert musicianship and total irreverence for the music scene in general, and heavy metal in particular. 

After various line-up changes, the band's first release featured: Luke Skeels (guitar), Sean Condon (vocals), Troy Takaki (bass), Mike Branum (drums). Condon was later replaced by Jimi Hayes.

Their songs, performed in a mock-speed-metal/punk style, include such topics as beer, Satan, chicken and The Grateful Dead.

Hell's Kitchen has released two full-length albums as well as appearing on an episode of HBO's Tales from the Crypt.

The band toured Europe twice in 1990, covering most, if not all, of Western Europe as well as parts of Scandinavia, and a few Eastern Bloc countries as well. Shows were played with German punk bands such as Spermbirds and Militant Mothers.

In 2012, Luke Skeels announced that Hell's Kitchen was re-forming and asked Oakland rapper Eastbay Slick to assume the role of vocalist for future performances.

Members

Original members
 Luke Skeels - Guitar †
 Jimi Haze - Vocals†
 Troy Takaki - Bass †
 Mike Branum(also known as Mikey Hanson)  - Drums †

Former members

 Tom Flynn - Guitar (1988)
 Dave "Koko" Chavez - Bass/Vocals (1988)
 Chris Kontos - Drums (1988)
 Sean Condon - Vocals (1988–89) †
 Chachi - Guitar (1989) ‡
 Marty Ros - Guitar (1990–91)
 Andy - Bass (1991)
 Greg Elliot - Guitar (1990)
 Pat Mack - Bass (1990)
 Mikey I.C. Shoop - Drums
 Sid Browne - Guitar

Discography
 If You Can't Take The Heat (LP - Boner Records) - 1988 (†)
 Fistful Of Chicken (LP - Weird System Records) - 1990 (‡)

There was also a demo cassette released with the original line-up called, Fast Food Demo (1987).

References

Hard rock musical groups from California
Musical groups from Oakland, California
Boner Records artists